St. Stephen's Episcopal Pro-Cathedral is an Episcopal church located in Wilkes-Barre, Luzerne County, Pennsylvania. It is the Pro-Cathedral in the Diocese of Bethlehem. The Cathedral Church of the Nativity in Bethlehem, Pennsylvania serves as the primary cathedral of the diocese.

St. Stephen's Church began in 1817. The present church building is the fifth one for the parish.  It was completed in 1897 and consecrated in 1899.  Philadelphia architect Charles M. Burns designed the church in the Romanesque Revival style.

References

Religious organizations established in 1817
Churches completed in 1897
19th-century Episcopal church buildings
Romanesque Revival church buildings in Pennsylvania
Episcopal churches in Pennsylvania
Stephen, Wilkes-Barre
Buildings and structures in Wilkes-Barre, Pennsylvania
Churches on the National Register of Historic Places in Pennsylvania
National Register of Historic Places in Luzerne County, Pennsylvania
Historic district contributing properties in Pennsylvania